Picola West is a locality in northern Victoria, Australia in the local government area of the Shire of Moira.

The Post office opened on 15 March 1886, and closed on 30 June 1971.

References

Towns in Victoria (Australia)
Shire of Moira